was the thirtieth of the fifty-three stations of the Tōkaidō. It is located in the western portion of Hamamatsu in Shizuoka Prefecture, Japan. During the Edo period, the area was part of Tōtōmi Province. The kanji for the post station were originally written 舞坂 (Maisaka).

History
Travelers crossed the lake to reach Arai-juku, the next post station on the Tōkaidō. A pine colonnade from the Edo period remains today and stretches from Maisaka Station to the entrance for the post station.

Many visitors still come to the area, which is popular with fishermen and clam-diggers. However, none of the old streetscape remains today; only part of one old sub-honjin remains.

The classic ukiyo-e print by Andō Hiroshige (Hōeidō edition) from 1831 to 1834 depicts a small port, with Mount Fuji having become a very small landmark in the distance.

Neighboring post towns
Tōkaidō
Hamamatsu-juku - Maisaka-juku - Arai-juku

Further reading
Carey, Patrick. Rediscovering the Old Tokaido:In the Footsteps of Hiroshige. Global Books UK (2000). 
Chiba, Reiko. Hiroshige's Tokaido in Prints and Poetry. Tuttle. (1982) 
Taganau, Jilly. The Tokaido Road: Travelling and Representation in Edo and Meiji Japan. RoutledgeCurzon (2004).

References

Stations of the Tōkaidō
Stations of the Tōkaidō in Shizuoka Prefecture